Drew Arthur Romo (born August 29, 2001) is an American professional baseball catcher in the Colorado Rockies organization. He was selected 35th overall by the Rockies in the 2020 Major League Baseball draft.

Amateur career
Romo attended The Woodlands High School in The Woodlands, Texas, where he played baseball. In 2018, he was selected for U-18 United States national baseball team. As a junior in 2019, he hit .397 with four home runs and 35 RBIs while compiling a .993 fielding percentage. Romo spent that summer playing for the USA Baseball 18U National Team as well as participating in the Under Armour All-American Game. He committed to play college baseball at Louisiana State University.

Professional career
The Colorado Rockies selected Romo with the 35th overall pick in the 2020 Major League Baseball draft. He signed with the Rockies on July 1 for a bonus of $2,095,800. He did not play a minor league game in 2020 due to the cancellation of the minor league season caused by the COVID-19 pandemic.

Romo was assigned to the Fresno Grizzlies of the Low-A West for the 2021 season, slashing .314/.345/.439 with six home runs, 47 RBIs, and 23 stolen bases over 79 games. He was assigned to the Spokane Indians of the High-A Northwest League for the 2022 season. Over 101 games, he hit .254 with five home runs, 58 RBIs, and 19 stolen bases.

Personal life
Romo is a Christian. Romo grew up a fan of the Houston Astros and the New York Yankees.

References

External links

2001 births
Living people
Baseball catchers
Baseball players from California
People from Fountain Valley, California
United States national baseball team players
Fresno Grizzlies players